The Gentleman Homicide was an American Christian metal band,  primarily playing a metalcore style of music, with death metal breakdowns. They came from Amarillo, Texas. The band started making music in 2003 and disbanded around 2007. The band released a studio album, Understanding the Words We Speak , in 2006, with Blood and Ink Records.

Background
The Gentleman Homicide is a Christian metal band from Amarillo, Texas. Their members are lead vocalist, Josh Barbee, guitarists, Adam Thron and Max Vinson, bassist, Josh Jackson, and drummer, Matt Jameson.

Music history
The band formed in 2003, with their first release, Understanding the World We Speak, a studio album, being released on July 11, 2006 by Blood and Ink Records.

Members
Current members
 Josh Barbee - vocals
 Adam Thron - guitar
 Max Vinson - guitar
 Josh Jackson - bass
 Matt Jameson - drums

Discography
Studio albums
 Understanding the Words We Speak (July 11, 2006, Blood and Ink)

References

External links
 Blood and Ink Records

Musical groups from Texas
2003 establishments in Texas
2007 disestablishments in Texas
Musical groups established in 2003
Musical groups disestablished in 2007
Blood and Ink Records artists